Munkh Tumur or Möngke Temür (Mangutemir) (?–1280), son of Toqoqan Khan and Köchu Khatun of Oirat (daughter of Toralchi Küregen and granddaughter of Qutuqa Beki) and the grandson of Batu Khan. He was a khan of the Golden Horde, a division of the Mongol Empire in 1266–1280.
His name literally means "Eternal Iron" in the Mongolian language.

Early reign and foreign policy 

During his reign, the Mongols together with their subjects, several Turkic tribes and the Russian princes, undertook military campaigns against Byzantium (c. 1269–1271), Lithuania (1275), and Alans in Caucasus (1277). The very first yarlyk (license) found by historians was written on behalf of Mengu-Timur and contained information on the release of the Russian Orthodox Church from paying tribute to the Golden Horde, however, he was a shamanist. During the reign of Mengu-Timur, the Genoese traders purchased Caffa from the Mongols. But those Italian merchants paid taxes to Mongol khans and sometimes to Nogai.

Both the German crusaders and the Lithuanians threatened the safety of Russian lands. In 1268, he sent his forces to Novgorod to assist his Russian vassals to conquer Danish Estonia, but after the Battle of Wesenberg was forced to withdraw. In 1274 Smolensk, the last of Russian principalities, became subject to Möngke Temür khan of the Golden Horde. The Khan also dispatched his army along with Russian princes to Lithuania by the request of the duke Lev of Galicia-Volhynia in 1275.

In 1277, he ended the long siege of the Alani city Dyadkov with the assistance of his Russian vassals and crushed the rebellion of the Volga Bulgars in Kazan. And he allowed German traders to travel freely through his domain.

In 1280, he launched his campaign against Poland which ended in his defeat. He died soon after this unsuccessful campaign.

Golden Horde and the Mongol Empire 

Munkh Tumur was originally nominated by Kublai Khan. But he sided with Kaidu who was a rival of the latter. Kublai only stopped him from invading the Ilkhanate with a large force. The Golden Horde helped Kaidu to put down the force of the Chagatai Khanate. In 1265, Kaidu was defeated by the Chagatai army under Ghiyas-ud-din Baraq. That is why, the Khan of the Jochid Ulus sent 30,000 armed-men headed by his uncle Berkecher to support Kaidu's force. Their victory over the Chagatai army forced Ghiyas-ud-din Baraq to initiate a peace treaty with them. Together they formed an alliance and demarcated the borders of their realms in Talas. Rashid al-Din claims that the meeting took place in the spring of 1269 in Talas, while Wassaf writes that it took place around 1267 to the south of Samarkand. Though He and Kaidu admonished Baraq for invading the Ilkhanate, Mengu Timur congratulated Ilkhan Abagha upon his stunning victory over the Chagatai army in order to hide his true intention. The two had been probably fighting with each other until the 1270s. But some scholars  disaffirm that such battles occurred. By the 1270s, they had signed a peace treaty. In addition to the peace treaty, Abagha allowed Mongke Temur to collect tax income from some of the workshops in his khanate.

Although there were no major wars between the Ilkhanate and the Golden Horde, Mongke Temur intended to restore his ancestors' authority over Azerbaijan and the Caucasus. He sent delegates to the Sultan of Mamluk Sultanate, Al-Zahir Baybars and offered a joint attack on Abagha's territory.

During that time, Kublai dispatched his favorite son, Nomu Khan, against Kaidu to Almaliq. Nomu Khan sent letters to Chingisid nobles to reassert their support. Mongke Temur responded that he would protect Kublai from Kaidu if he assaulted the Yuan. In 1276, Chingisid princes Shiregi and Tokhtemur defected to Kaidu's side and arrested Kublai's son. Then they sent Nomughan and his brother Kökechü to Mengu Temur and his general to Kaidu. The court of the Golden Horde released Nomughan in 1278 or 10 years later. It seems that Mengu Timur held him as a pawn in the wars of the Mongol world. He died of a neck injury in 1280.

Family 
Mengu Timur married several times:

 Öljei Khatun — daughter of Saljidai Küregen of Khongirad and Kelmish Aqa (daughter of Qutuqtu)
 Alqui
 Toqta
 Sultan Khatun (from Hüshin tribe)
 Abachi
 Tödeken
 Qutuqui Khatun (unknown tribe)
 Börlük

With unknown wives and concubines:

 Tudan
 Cholkhan
 Sarai Buqa
 Moloqai
 Ulus Buqa
 Qadan
 Qoduqai
 Künges
 Toghrilcha
 Öz Beg khan
Jani beg khan/jani Muhammad khan the sin of Oz beg khan(sultan Gayas ud Din)
Bardi beg  khan,tani beg ( Jani beg)

Din Muhammad ,valu muhammah khan,Baki muhammah khan,was the son of jani beg /jani Muhammad khan
Iamon Quli khan the son of Din Muhammad.

See also
List of Khans of the Golden Horde
Kaidu–Kublai war
Munkh

References

1282 deaths
Khans of the Golden Horde
13th-century monarchs in Europe
Year of birth unknown